The 12th Regiment, Tennessee Infantry was an infantry regiment from Tennessee that served with the Confederate States Army in the American Civil War.

Service

It was mustered in 1861, consisting mostly of men from Gibson County. Colonel Tyree Harris Bell was its commanding officer. Robert Porter Caldwell was the major for the regiment. The regiment fought in notable battles, including the Battle of Shiloh.

See also
List of Tennessee Confederate Civil War units

References

External links
 12th Tennessee Infantry Regiment, Tennessee and the Civil War

Units and formations of the Confederate States Army from Tennessee
Military units and formations disestablished in 1865
1865 disestablishments in Tennessee
1861 establishments in Tennessee
Military units and formations established in 1861